HMS Marquis de Seignelay, was the French privateer Marquis de Seignelay from Le Havre, active in 1779–1800. The British Royal Navy captured her in 1780 and recommissioned her as the 14-gun sloop HMS Marquis de Seignelay. She was sold in March 1786.

Privateer
Between 1779 and December 1780, Marquis de Seignelay, under the command of François Cottin, captured 40 ships totaling 117 guns and 418 prisoners.

Lloyd's List reported on 28 January 1780 that the French privateer Marquis of Seignety, of Dunkirk, with 160 men, had captured Harpooner, Hill, master, of 56 men and boys. The action had lasted two hours and Marquis had taken Harpooner into Havre de Grace.

Capture
On 9 December 1780  and  captured two French privateers behind the Isle of Wight after a short action. The two were Comptesse of Buzanisis, Lux, master, and Marques de Seiguley. Each had a crew of 150 men. Comptesse was armed with twenty 12-pounder guns and Marques was armed with twenty 9-pounder guns. In the action Solebay had one man wounded, and Portland had nine, two of whom died later. Comptesse of Buzanisis was believed to have been the English privateer Harpooner.

British Royal Navy
The Royal Navy commissioned Marquis de Seignelay (or Marquise de Seignelly) in November 1782. John Hunter was appointed to Commander in her on 12 November 1782. She was paid off in February 1786. The Navy sold her on 23 March. Hunter was promoted to post captain on 15 December 1786.

Notes, citations, and references
Notes

Citations

References
 
 

1779 ships
Ships built in France
Privateer ships of France
Captured ships
Sloops of the Royal Navy